Saša Stanković (born April 5, 1972) is a former Serbian professional basketball player.

References

External links
 
 

1972 births
Living people
Basketball League of Serbia players
KK MZT Skopje players
KK Zdravlje players
KK Radnik Surdulica players
Serbian men's basketball players
Serbian expatriate basketball people in North Macedonia
Sportspeople from Leskovac
Small forwards